Jiangsu Ladies Football Club (Jiāngsū Zúqiú Jùlèbù) is a professional football club based in Nanjing, Jiangsu, China. They compete in the Chinese Women's Super League, and their home stadium is Wutaishan Stadium. They have won two league titles.

History 
The team was originally founded in 1998 on the initiative of the provincial government and the provincial sports office, and enrolled in the then Chinese Women's Premier Football League managed to move from ninth place in 2001, and after being renamed the Women's Super League to fourth in 2005 , the second in 2008 and winning the championship in 2009.

Between the seasons 2011 and 2014, the tournament was re-designated Women's National Football League, interrupting the promotion and relegation procedure to and from the cadet series due to the lack of available teams and players. In this period the team achieves the best result in 2012, ranking second behind the Dalian Shide champions by repeating the placements of the 2008 edition.

Over the years, the team has provided the Chinese national team with more than one player, among whom the most representative are Song Xiaoli, Zhang Yanru, Weng Xinzhi, Zhou Gaoping and Ma Jun.

In 2015, the Chinese Football Association decided to relaunch the tournament, returning to the Women's Super League designation by reconstituting a second affiliated division, the CWFL.

In March 2016, Suning Commerce Group announced that it had acquired ownership of the team making it the women's section of Jiangsu Suning F.C.

As part of improving its staff, the management of the company convinces Norwegian international Isabell Herlovsen as well as four-time champion of Norway with LSK Kvinner and top scorer of 2016 Toppserien, to move to Jiangsu Suning, joining the other foreigner of the team, the Brazilian Gabi Zanotti, an operation that proves to be positive by winning third place at the end of the 2017 season. the 2018 season enters into a contract with Malawian international Tabitha Chawinga taken this time from the Damallsvenskan and which despite being graduated top scorer of the 2017 Damallsvenskan with 26 goals to his credit, she couldn't avoid the relegation of Kvarnsvedens. With the new arrival, the company makes a further leap in quality, with Chawinga at the top of the ranking of the scorers already in the middle of the championship. She was later joined by Ghanaian international Elizabeth Addo in 2019. The duo helped Jiangsu quadruple during the 2019 season. At the end of the season, the club were also runners-up in the maiden 2019 AFC Women's Club Championship.

On 28 February 2021, the parent company Suning Holdings Group announced that operations were going to cease immediately alongside the men and youth teams. The ownership of the Ladies Football Club was returned to the Administration of Sport of Jiangsu, but the club did not have enough time to register for the 2021 National Championship. 

On 8 March 2022, the team announced that Chan Yuen Ting, the first woman to coach a men's professional football team to the championship of a nation's top league, will be the team's new coach.

Stadium 
Jiangsu Suning L.F.C. play their home matches at Wutaishan Stadium.

Players

Current squad

Honours 
Chinese Women's Super League
Champions (2): 2009, 2019
Chinese National Women's Football Championship (全国女子足球锦标赛)
Champions (2): 2018, 2019
Chinese Women's Football Association Cup (中国女子足协杯)
Champions (3): 2017, 2018, 2019
Chinese Women's Super Cup (中国女子超级杯)
Champions (1): 2019

Record in AFC Women's Club Championship

All results (home, away and aggregate) list Jiangsu L.F.C.'s goal tally first.

See also 
Jiangsu F.C.

References 

Chinese Women's Super League clubs
1998 establishments in China
Association football clubs established in 1998
Sport in Nanjing
Sport in Jiangsu